The 2016 Basingstoke and Deane Borough Council election took place on 5 May 2016 to elect members of Basingstoke and Deane Borough Council in England. This was on the same day as other local elections.

Results

Results by Ward

Basing

Baughurst and Tadley North

Bramley and Sherfield

Brighton Hill South

Brookvale and Kings Furlong

Buckskin

Chineham

Hatch Warren and Beggarwood

Kempshott

Kingsclere

Norden

Oakley and North Waltham

Pamber and Silchester

Popley East

Popley West

Rooksdown

Sherborne St John

South Ham

Tadley South

Whitchurch

References

2016 English local elections
2016
2010s in Hampshire